Uliana Paletskaya (died 1569), was a Princess of Russia by marriage to Yuri of Uglich.

She was the daughter of Dmitry Paletsky. She married Yuri in 1547. They had a son. She was forced to become a nun when she was widowed, by her brother-in-law the czar. In 1569, she was drowned by order of the tsar.

References

Иулиания Дмитриевна // Русский биографический словарь : в 25 томах. — СПб.—М., 1896—1918.

1569 deaths
16th-century Russian women
16th-century Russian people
Year of birth unknown